The Way It Was, The Way It Is is the sixteenth studio album by American R&B singer Lou Rawls. It peaked at number 103 on the Billboard Top LPs & Tape chart in 1969.

Track listing

Side one 
"Fa Fa Fa Fa Fa (Sad Song)" – 2:38
"Trying Just as Hard as I Can" – 2:36
"Your Good Thing (Is About to End)" – 4:30
"I Love You Yes I Do" – 4:03
"When a Man Loves a Woman" – 2:55

Side two 
"Season of the Witch" – 5:50
"Gentle on My Mind" – 2:49
"I Wonder" – 2:45
"I Want to Be Loved (But Only by You)" – 2:51
"It's You" – 2:39

Charts

References 

1969 albums
Lou Rawls albums